Noyon is a railway station serving the town Noyon, Oise department, northern France. It is situated on the Creil–Jeumont railway.

Services

The station is served by regional trains to Creil, Saint-Quentin and Paris.

References

Railway stations in Oise
Railway stations in France opened in 1848
Gare de Noyon